Cater Allen is a private bank operating in the United Kingdom. It is a subsidiary of Santander UK. Tracing its history back to a bank founded in Blackburn in 1816, it was independent for 180 years, before being purchased in 1997 by Abbey National. Cater Allen Offshore was initially run as a separate enterprise within Abbey, but in 2001 it was merged with Abbey National Offshore.

The Cater Allen name came about relatively late in the bank's history, from Cater Ryder's 1981 acquisition of Allen, Harvey and Ross. Cater Ryder itself had been formed 20 years earlier by the merger of Cater and Co. (founded 1908) and Ryder's Discount Co.

Cater Allen has significantly expanded twice in the past twenty years, with the 1994 acquisition of Tyndall Bank, and the 2001 acquisition of Fleming Premier Banking from JPMorgan Chase.

References

External links

Banco Santander